BeoBasket Ltd is a Serbian full-service sports agency based in Belgrade. It is founded by lawyer and former professional basketball player Miško Ražnatović.

The company has been recognized as the agency which holds record in number of players signed in EuroLeague, EuroCup and all top European national competitions, including the most important and highest paid deals in Europe. Additionally, in partnership with Excel Sports Management, they are a European agency with highest number of players in the National Basketball Association (NBA).

History 
In the 2017–18 EuroLeague season, BeoBasket represented 35 players, and they were the first-ranked agency. In the 2018–19 EuroLeague season, BeoBasket represented 43 players, and they were the first-ranked agency. In the 2019–20 EuroLeague season, BeoBasket represented 42 players, and they were again the first-ranked agency. In the 2020–21 EuroLeague season, BeoBasket represented 46 players, and they were again the first-ranked agency. In the 2021–22 EuroLeague season, BeoBasket represented total 52 players which was the new record and again, they were the first-ranked agency.

Staff members 
The following individuals are employed by the company:
  Miško Ražnatović, chairman and CEO
  Dragan Jankovski, Senior vice-president and director of German basketball
  Predrag Materić, Vice President and director of French basketball
  Serhat Koymen, director of Turkish basketball 
  Moises Cohen, director of Spanish basketball
  Slobodan Šljivančanin, director of Russian and Ukrainian basketball
  Aleksandar Avlijaš, director of Polish and Romanian basketball
  Jasmin Hukić, director of Slovenian basketball
  , director of Great Britain basketball

Basketball players

Europe 
BeoBasket represents or have represented the following active or retired athletes:

İsmet Akpınar
Dwayne Bacon
Billy Baron
Rodrigue Beaubois
Will Clyburn
Dejan Davidovac
Brandon Davies
Nihad Đedović
Alpha Diallo
Ognjen Dobrić
Oscar da Silva
Bryant Dunston
Erten Gazi
Niels Giffey
Marko Gudurić
Darrun Hilliard
Kyle Hines
Othello Hunter
Nikola Ivanović
Ognjen Jaramaz
Livio Jean-Charles
Paul Lacombe
Joffrey Lauvergne
Branko Lazić
Vladimir Lučić
Hassan Martin
Vasilije Micić
Josh Nebo
Nemanja Nedović
Landry Nnoko
Andreas Obst
Dylan Osetkowski
Kendrick Perry
Filip Petrušev
Dyshawn Pierre
Leon Radošević
Augustine Rubit
Marko Simonović
Žan Mark Šiško
Marial Shayok
Markel Starks
Johannes Thiemann
Khyri Thomas
Nikola Topić
Aleksa Uskoković
Jan Veselý
Léo Westermann
Scottie Wilbekin
Aaron White
Maik Zirbes
Ante Žižić
Paul Zipser

NBA
BeoBasket, in a partnership with U.S.-based sports agent Jeff A. Schwartz, represents or have represented the following active or retired athletes:

 Džanan Musa
 Mirza Teletović
 Dario Šarić
 Ivica Zubac
 Ante Žižić
 Jan Veselý 
 Joffrey Lauvergne
 Adam Mokoka
 Timothé Luwawu-Cabarrot
 Goga Bitadze
 Paul Zipser
 Vassilis Spanoulis
 Omar Cook
 Nikola Peković 
 Marko Simonović
 Juan Toscano-Anderson
 Pero Antić
 Marko Gudurić
 Nemanja Nedović 
 Nenad Krstić
 Nikola Jokić
 Nikola Jović
 Boban Marjanović
 Vlatko Čančar
 Cedi Osman 
 Jared Cunningham
 Brandon Davies
 Darrun Hilliard 
 DeMarcus Nelson
 Khyri Thomas 
 Deron Williams

Basketball coaches

 Ergin Ataman
 Dušan Ivković
 Dejan Milojević
 Saša Obradović
 Dejan Radonjić
 Neven Spahija

References

External links
 

Companies based in Belgrade
D.o.o. companies in Serbia
Serbian companies established in 1995
Service companies of Serbia
Sports management companies
KK Mega Basket